Rajiv Pratap Rudy (born 30 March 1962) is an Indian politician from the Bharatiya Janata Party, and a Member of Parliament representing Saran (Lok Sabha constituency) in Bihar, India.

In 2014. Rudy became the Minister of State (Independent Charge) for Skill Development and Entrepreneurship in Narendra Modi's government. Simultaneously he also shared Parliamentary Affairs department jointly with Minister of State, Mukhtar Abbas Naqvi. Rudy was a General Secretary of Bharatiya Janata Party, a position relinquished soon after he joined the government. Rudy is a trained pilot and holds a commercial pilot's license. He is featured in the Limca Book of Records as the only parliamentarian to fly a commercial aircraft, an Airbus-320 of Indigo airlines.

Early life
Rajiv Pratap Rudy was born to Vishwanath Singh and Prabha Singh on 30 March 1962 in Patna, Bihar. His ancestral village is Amnour, Saran, Bihar. Rudy completed his school education from St. Michael's High School, Patna. Later, he completed his pre-university and pre-engineering from DAV College, Chandigarh. He completed his graduation in  B.A. (Hons.) in Economics at Government College, Chandigarh. Later he also completed a degree in Law from Panjab University in 1985 and studied post-graduation in Economics from Magadh University in 1987.

Prior to joining politics, he was a lecturer of Economics in A.N. College, Patna though he was involved in student politics at Panjab University at Chandigarh when studying at Government College.

Political career
Rudy was the campaign in charge of Harmohan Dhawan, who was contesting from the Chandigarh Lok Sabha constituency in 1989. He was actively associated with former Prime Minister Chandra Shekhar. Rudy was first elected in 1990 as a Member of the Bihar Legislative Assembly on Janata Dal ticket from Taraiya at the young age of 28. He was elected to the Lok Sabha - the lower house of the Parliament of India - as a candidate of the BJP. He was re–elected for a second term of Lok Sabha in 1999, from Chapra (Lok Sabha constituency) for BJP. He then served as the Minister of State for Commerce, Trade & Industry and subsequently became Civil Aviation Minister with independent charge in the National Democratic Alliance government led by Atal Bihari Vajpayee. During that tenure, Rudy was in controversy of non-payment of his bills at Taj Exotica Resort & Spa, Goa, which he had to later pay.

Rudy had earlier held the post of National Vice President of the Bharatiya Janata Yuva Morcha. He was the General Secretary and member of the BJP National Executive.

Rudy lost to Lalu Prasad in 2004 General elections in Chapra (Lok Sabha constituency). He was then elected to Rajya Sabha from Bihar in 2010. He contested the 2014 Lok Sabha Elections from Saran (Lok Sabha constituency) and defeated former Chief Minister of Bihar, Rabri Devi. following which he was sworn-in as Minister of State on 9 November 2014 and got Minister of State (Independent Charge) of Skill Development & Entrepreneurship.

In October 2015, Rajiv Pratap Rudy was in a controversy over sharing on Twitter a screenshot of Pakistan's daily Dawn website carrying Nitish Kumar's ad of vote appeal during 2015 Bihar Legislative Assembly election, prompting JD(U) to launch a sharp attack on him and seek his immediate sacking. He submitted his resignation from the cabinet on 31/8/2017 prior to imminent reshuffle in September 2017.

In May 2021, Rajiv Pratap Rudy was criticized when 30 unused ambulances were found parked at his Amnour Vishw-Prabha community centre, even when Bihar was struggling under second wave of COVID-19 pandemic. These ambulances were purchased using funds from the Members of Parliament Local Area Development Scheme (MPLADS). Jan Adhikar Party chief Pappu Yadav raided that community centre run by Rudy.

Personal life
Rudy married Neelam Pratap on 9 March 1991 at the age of 29. They have two daughters.
Elder daughter Avshreya Rudy (born 1993) is a lawyer and also a polo player. His younger daughter Atisha Pratap Singh (born 2000) is a kuchipudi dancer.

References

External links

|-

|-

|-

|-

External links
 
 
 

Bharatiya Janata Party politicians from Bihar
Bihar People's Party politicians
1962 births
Living people
India MPs 1996–1997
India MPs 1999–2004
Rajya Sabha members from Bihar
Lok Sabha members from Bihar
India MPs 2014–2019
Civil aviation ministers of India
Ministry of Skill Development and Entrepreneurship
Narendra Modi ministry
People from Saran district
India MPs 2019–present
Panjab University alumni
Magadh University alumni
Bihari politicians